The 43M Zrínyi II was a Hungarian assault gun of the World War II period based on the Turán chassis. While the Turán in itself wasn't particularly successful, it did give birth to a rather good self-propelled-gun: the Zrínyi assault gun.

Development

The Zrínyi's development process started in 1942; after the Hungarian delegation had the chance to witness the success of the StuG III Ausf. F armed with a long 75 mm anti-tank gun or short 105 mm howitzer.

Hungary attempted to negotiate with Germany to try and acquire StuG IIIs. However, they could only receive a fraction of what they needed, and started to design a similar vehicle of their own.

Following the success of assault guns on the Eastern Front, the situation required the fastest way possible to start the production of a vehicle of the same role. The engineers at the Manfréd Weiss Works decided to use the base of the Turán tank as it was a proven, solid chassis already in use in the Hungarian army.

As for the armament, both a first variant mounting the long-barrelled 43M 75 mm anti-tank gun (which was still in development), and another version equipped with the 40M 105 mm MÁVAG howitzer which was compatible with the leFH 18's ammunition was considered.

Design
The hull of the Turán was made wider and higher to make space to house the large caliber cannon, with the front armor being reinforced to a total thickness of 75 mm.

The first variant would become the 44M Zrínyi I armed with the 43M 75 mm gun and 100 mm frontal armor, being accepted for service in 1944, and the latter one resulted in the 43M Zrínyi II. The Zrínyi II was armed with a short barrel (14 or 20.5 calibers) 105 mm MÁVAG 40/43M howitzer. The Zrínyi II's design was a traditional infantry support vehicle, while the Zrínyi I was hoped to fulfill an anti-tank role.

Production
After the successful army trials in December 1942, the military leadership ordered 40 Zrínyi IIs. These were finished until the end of 1943. In January 1944, 50 more vehicles were ordered, 20 of these rolled out of the factories between March and July.

On July 27, after 6 new Zrínyis were finished in the morning, an aircraft raided and bombed the factory which crashed. Around 20 semi-finished Zrínyi 105s were saved and at least 6 of them were rebuilt by Ganz. A total number of 72 43M Zrínyi IIs were delivered to the armored units leastwise.

Service
The 43M Zrínyis were sent to the 1st, 2nd and 3rd assault battalions, and mainly fought in Galicia in the summer of 1944 against the massive Soviet offensive.

Several Zrínyi IIs were captured by the USSR during the Soviet occupation of Hungary, one was also captured by Romania during October 1944, but it was later confiscated by the Red Army.

There is only one surviving Zrínyi II in the Kubinka tank museum near Moscow.

References

Sources
 Bíró Ádám: A 40/43. M Zrínyi–II rohamtarack fejlesztése és alkalmazása. Haditechnika, I. rész: 1996/1, 66–71., II. rész: 1996/2, 43–45.; III. rész: 1996/4, 66–69. (In Hungarian)
 Mark Axworthy, Cornel Scafeș, Cristian Crãciunoiu, Third Axis. Fourth Ally. Romanian Armed Forces in the European War, 1941-1945, Arms and Armour, London, 1995.

External links
 
 https://web.archive.org/web/20080310083509/http://www.freedom.hu/IIvh/Fegyverek/Magyar/zrinyi.htm 
 http://www.haborumuveszete.hu/rovatok/fegyverek/pancelosok/zrinyik/ 

Armoured fighting vehicles of Hungary
World War II assault guns
Military vehicles introduced from 1940 to 1944